Rae Tod (8 December 1913 - 3 August 1995) was a Scottish rugby union player. He was the 81st President of the Scottish Rugby Union.

Rugby Union career

Amateur career

He played for Edinburgh Academicals.

Administrative career

He became President of the Edinburgh Academical rugby club.

He joined the SRU committee in 1956.

He became the 81st President of the Scottish Rugby Union. He served the standard one year from 1967 to 1968.

Cricket career

He played cricket for Edinburgh Academicals.

He would later become the President of the Edinburgh Academical cricket club.

Military career

Tod was in the Royal Scots. During the Second World War he fought in North Africa and Italy. He achieved the rank of Major and on coming home to Scotland he led the victory parade along Princes Street in Edinburgh.

Business career

He joined the stockbroking firm of John Robertson and worked his way to senior partner.

The firm amalgamated with Bell Cowan and Co.

He was a Chairman of the Edinburgh Stock Exchange from 1968 to 1970.

He was a Chairman of the Scottish Stock Exchange from 1972 to 1973.

In 1974 he was part of the Edinburgh branch of Parsons & Company. That was consumed by the larger Glasgow company which became Allied Provincial Parsons Penney. He retired from there in 1987.

Other interests

Tod was a keen golfer and squash player.

Family

Tod was the youngest son of Ross Tod, formerly of 8 Learmouth Place, Edinburgh.

His brother, Ben Ross Tod, played cricket for Scotland. He played rugby for the Barbarians. He also played for Edinburgh Academicals and represented Edinburgh District and played in trial matches for Scotland selection. He captained the Edinburgh Academical cricket club. He married Jean Aitken who played lacrosse for Edinburgh Satelittes.

His sister, Barra Tod, was a Scottish international tennis player.

His wife, Muriel Shank Menzies, died on 9 June 1995; they were survived by four children. Muriel's father was George Macbeth Menzies, chairman of the North British Steel foundry in Bathgate.

References

1913 births
1995 deaths
Scottish rugby union players
Presidents of the Scottish Rugby Union
Rugby union players from Edinburgh
Edinburgh Academicals rugby union players